Ianthea Leigertwood-Octave is a Vincentian jurist, who was judge of the Eastern Caribbean Supreme Court with jurisdiction over St. Kitts and Nevis, serving from 2006 to 2014.

References

Eastern Caribbean Supreme Court justices
Living people
Saint Vincent and the Grenadines judges
Year of birth missing (living people)
Saint Vincent and the Grenadines judges of international courts and tribunals
University of the West Indies alumni